Svastra atripes is a species of long-horned bee in the family Apidae. It is found in North America.

Subspecies
These three subspecies belong to the species Svastra atripes:
 Svastra atripes atrimitra (LaBerge, 1956)
 Svastra atripes atripes (Cresson, 1872)
 Svastra atripes georgica (Cresson, 1878)

References

Further reading

External links

 

Apinae
Articles created by Qbugbot
Insects described in 1872